City Beneath the Sea is a 1953 American adventure film directed by Budd Boetticher and starring Robert Ryan, Mala Powers, Anthony Quinn and Suzan Ball. The film is based on the book Port Royal: The Ghost City Beneath the Sea by Harry E. Rieseberg.

Plot
In Jamaica, salvage divers Brad and Tony are hired by Dwight Trevor to find The Lady Luck, a ship that supposedly sank with all hands and $1,000,000 in gold bullion. There is no trace of the sunken ship, but there is a sunken city, the city of Port Royal that was destroyed in an earthquake in 1692. The gold bullion was actually lost in a modern-day quake and is part of an insurance fraud perpetrated by Trevor. He does not want the divers to find the gold and will stop at nothing to ensure the success of his plan.

Cast
 Robert Ryan as Brad Carlton
 Mala Powers as Terry McBride
 Anthony Quinn as Tony Nartlett
 Suzan Ball as Venita aka Mary Lou Beetle
 George Mathews as Capt. Meade aka Ralph Sorensen
 Karel Štěpánek as Dwight Trevor
 Hilo Hattie as Mama Mary
 Lalo Ríos as Calypso
 Woody Strode as Djion
 John Warburton as Captain Clive
 Peter Mamakos as Captain Pedro Mendoza
 Barbara Morrison as Madame Cecile
 LeRoi Antoine as Calypso singer
 Leon Lontoc as Kip
 Marya Marco as Half caste woman

See also
 List of American films of 1953

References

External links

1953 films
1950s adventure drama films
American adventure drama films
Films based on non-fiction books
Films directed by Budd Boetticher
Films set in Jamaica
Universal Pictures films
Treasure hunt films
Underwater action films
1953 drama films
1950s English-language films
1950s American films